The Emory School, also known as the Tunstall School, is a historic Rosenwald School building in rural Hale County, Alabama, United States.  It was built in 1915 to the designs of W.A. Hazel to serve the local African American community. The money to build the school was provided by the Julius Rosenwald Fund.  The school was listed on the National Register of Historic Places on February 20, 1998, as a part of The Rosenwald School Building Fund and Associated Buildings Multiple Property Submission.

References

National Register of Historic Places in Hale County, Alabama
School buildings on the National Register of Historic Places in Alabama
School buildings completed in 1915
Defunct schools in Alabama
Rosenwald schools in Alabama
Historically segregated African-American schools in Alabama
1915 establishments in Alabama